Iain Lambie (born 13 April 1954) is a former Scotland international rugby union player.

Rugby Union career

Amateur career

He played for Watsonians.

Provincial career

He played for Edinburgh District.

International career

He was capped by Scotland 'B' twice against France 'B' from 1976 to 1978.

He played for Scotland four times, from 1978 to 1979.

References

1954 births
Living people
Scottish rugby union players
Scotland international rugby union players
Rugby union players from Edinburgh
Watsonians RFC players
Scotland 'B' international rugby union players
Edinburgh District (rugby union) players
Rugby union number eights